Ust-Nera is an urban locality (an urban-type settlement) and the administrative center of Oymyakonsky District in Yakutia, Russia. As of the 2010 Census, its population was 6,463.

Geography
Ust-Nera is located at the confluence of the Nera and Indigirka Rivers, from which it takes its name (the ust- part means river mouth in Russian).

The Tas-Kystabyt, Silyap Range and the Nera Plateau are located in the district.

Climate
Ust-Nera has an extremely cold subarctic climate (Köppen climate classification Dwd) with mild, wet summers and severely cold, dry winters.

<div style="width:70%;">

History

Ust-Nera was founded in 1937 in conjunction with gold mining and exploration in the Indigirka and Kolyma regions. In the Soviet era, it served as a base for forced labor camps of the gulag. Urban-type settlement status was granted to Ust-Nera in 1950.

Administrative and municipal status
Within the framework of administrative divisions, the urban-type settlement of Ust-Nera serves as the administrative center of Oymyakonsky District. As an administrative division, it is incorporated within Oymyakonsky District as the Settlement of Ust-Nera. As a municipal division, the Settlement of Ust-Nera is incorporated within Oymyakonsky Municipal District as Ust-Nera Urban Settlement.

Economy
Gold mining is the main occupation. The Kolyma Highway was extended northwest to Ust-Nera in 1937; this section is now the main route between Yakutsk and Magadan. The Ust-Nera Airport is serving air traffic.

Culture
There is a small museum in Ust-Nera.

References

Notes

Sources
Official website of the Sakha Republic. Registry of the Administrative-Territorial Divisions of the Sakha Republic. Oymyakonsky District. 

Urban-type settlements in the Sakha Republic
Indigirka basin